Lucy Cruz is an American politician who served in the New York City Council from the 18th district from 1992 to 2001.

References

American politicians of Puerto Rican descent
Living people
New York City Council members
New York (state) Democrats
Hispanic and Latino American city council members
Hispanic and Latino American New York City Council members
Hispanic and Latino American women in politics
Year of birth missing (living people)
People from Bayamón, Puerto Rico
Women New York City Council members
Puerto Rican people in New York (state) politics